Joseph Bryennios was a learned Byzantine monk of the 15th century. He was a monk at the Monastery of Stoudios. He wrote many important works of scholarship in support of Orthodoxy, and against the Union of Churches. He died sometime between 1431 and 1438.

References

Bibliography 
 N. V. Tomadakis, «Ἁγιορειτικοὶ κώδικες τῶν ἔργων Ἰωσὴφ Βρυεννίου» Επ.Επ.Ετ.Βυζ.Σπ. Vol.32(1963), pp. 26–39.
 Konstantinos Dyovouniotis, «Τὸ δήθεν διπλωματικὸν απόρρητον του Ἰωσὴφ Βρυεννίου», Πρακτικὰ τῆς Ἀκαδημίας Ἀθηνῶν, Vol.4 (1923), pp. 117–184.
 N. V. Tomadakis, Ο Ιωσήφ Βρυέννιος και η Κρήτη κατά το 1400. Μελέτη φιλολογική και ιστορική. Athens 1947
 Nikolaos Ioannidis,  Ἰωσὴφ Βρυεννίου περὶ μνημοσύνου τοῦ Πάπα, Athens 1984
 E Peruzzi, «Ὁ τόπος τῆς ἐν Κρήτῃ διαμονής Ἰωσὴφ του Βρυεννίου», Cretica Chronica, Vol.2 (1948), pp. 366–370
 N. V. Tomadakis, «Ἰωσὴφ Βρυέννιος», Σύλλαβος βυζαντινῶν μελετῶν καὶ κειμένων. Athens 1961, pp. 491–611

1430s deaths
Eastern Orthodox theologians
Studite monks
15th-century Byzantine monks
Byzantine theologians
15th-century Byzantine writers
15th-century Eastern Orthodox theologians
Joseph